The 10,000 metres race walk is a racewalking event. The event is competed as a track race. Athletes must always keep in contact with the ground and the supporting leg must remain straight until the raised leg passes it. 10,000 meters is 6.21 miles.

History
This distance is not commonly raced at senior competitions but part of junior and youth championships. Top level senior athletics racewalking events typically feature 10 km road distance.

World best
On November 14, 2020, Eiki Takahashi of Japan set a new 10,000 m race walk world best in Inzai in a time of 37:25.21. The all-time women's 10,000 m race-walk record is held by Nadezhda Ryashkina of Soviet Union, at 41:56.23.

All-time top 25 (outdoor)
h = hand timing

Men
Correct as of February 2023.

Notes
Below is a list of other times equal or superior to 38:23.50:
Paquillo Fernández also walked 38:07.65 (2007).
Daisuke Matsunaga also walked 38:16.76 (2016).
Eiki Takahashi also walked 38:01.49 (2015), 38:18.51 (2014), 38:21.88 (2016).
David Smith also walked 38:20.9 (1985).
Ivano Brugnetti also walked 38:23.5 (2004).

Women
Correct as of August 2022.

Notes
Below is a list of other times equal or superior to 42:30.13:
Kerry Saxby-Junna also walked hand-timed 42:22.6 (1993), 42:23.9 (1992), 42:25.2 (1990), automatic-timed 42:26.29 (1993), and hand-timed 42:27.5 (1995).
Beate Gummelt also walked hand-timed 42:29.4 (1990), 38:21.88 (2016).
Gao Hongmiao also walked 42:30.13 (1995).

All-time top 25 (indoor)

Men
Correct as of 2 September 2018.

Women

Yelena Ginko also walked 44:07.43 (2006)

Medalists

European Athletics Championships

Notes

References

Racewalking distances